The following are the members of the Dewan Undangan Negeri or state assemblies, elected in the 1969 state election and by-elections. Also included is the list of the Sabah state assembly members who were elected in 1971.

Perlis

Kedah

Kelantan

Trengganu

Penang

Perak

Pahang

Selangor

Negri Sembilan

Malacca

Johore

Sabah

1971–1976

Sarawak

Notes

References

Abdullah, Z. G., Adnan, H. N., & Lee, K. H. (1997). Malaysia, tokoh dulu dan kini = Malaysian personalities, past and present. Kuala Lumpur, Malaysia: Penerbit Universiti Malaya.
Anzagain Sdn. Bhd. (2004). Almanak keputusan pilihan raya umum: Parlimen & Dewan Undangan Negeri, 1959-1999. Shah Alam, Selangor: Anzagain.
Chin, U.-H. (1996). Chinese politics in Sarawak: A study of the Sarawak United People's Party. Kuala Lumpur: Oxford University Press.
Faisal, S. H. (2012). Domination and Contestation: Muslim Bumiputera Politics in Sarawak. Institute of Southeast Asian Studies.
Hussain, M. (1987). Membangun demokrasi: Pilihanraya di Malaysia. Kuala Lumpur: Karya Bistari.
Ibnu, H. (1993). PAS kuasai Malaysia?: 1950-2000 sejarah kebangkitan dan masa depan. Kuala Lumpur: GG Edar.
Surohanjaya Pilehanraya Malaysia. (1972). Penyata pilehanraya umum Dewan Raʻayat dan Dewan Undangan Negeri bagi Negeri² Tanah Melayu, Sabah dan Sarawak, tahun 1969. Kuala Lumpur: Jabatan Chetak Kerajaan.
Vasil, R. K. (1972). The Malaysian general election of 1969. Singapore: Oxford University Press.

1969 elections in Malaysia